Statistics Korea (SK) is responsible for statistics in South Korea, and is part of Ministry of Economy and Finance.

Statistics Korea generates population and household census yearly (every 5 years until 2015). It also gathers analytic and administrative statistics.

References

External links
 Official site, in Korean and English

Government agencies of South Korea
South Korea